Nate Wolters (born May 15, 1991) is an American professional basketball player for Panathinaikos of the Greek Basket League and the EuroLeague. He played college basketball for South Dakota State University and was an All-American for the Jackrabbits in 2013. He was selected by the Washington Wizards with the 38th overall pick in the 2013 NBA draft.

College career
Wolters, a 6'4" point guard from Technical Senior High School in St. Cloud, Minnesota, chose South Dakota State over Colorado State and North Dakota State after averaging 24.3 points and 6.4 rebounds per game as a senior.  As a freshman, Wolters played in all 30 games for the Jackrabbits, starting 11.  For the season he averaged 10.1 points, 3.4 rebounds and 2.9 assists per game and was named to The Summit League all-newcomer team.  In his sophomore season, Wolters moved into the starting lineup full-time and became one of the conference's top players.  He averaged 19.5 points, 4.6 rebounds and 6.1 assists.  He led the league in assists and helped the team to a 19–12 record—the program's first winning season as a member of NCAA Division I.

As a junior, Wolters led the team to more new territory. The team finished the 2011–12 season with a 27–7 record, finishing second in the Summit League regular season. The second-seeded Jackrabbits beat Western Illinois 52–50 in overtime to advance to their first Division I NCAA tournament. Wolters was named tournament Most Valuable Player. In the NCAA Tournament, #14 seed South Dakota State played third-seeded Baylor in a tightly contested game, ultimately losing 68–60. Individually, Wolters averaged 21.2 points, 5.9 assists (again leading the conference) and 5.1 rebounds per game.  He was named first team all-conference and an honorable mention All-American by the Associated Press.

Entering his senior season, Wolters was named preseason Summit League player of the year.  He also was named to the preseason watch lists for the Senior CLASS Award and the Naismith College Player of the Year award. He also made the midseason lists for the Wooden Award (final 25 candidates) and the Bob Cousy Award (final 20). On January 18, 2013, Wolters surpassed the 2,000 point mark for his college career in a win against Western Illinois. Wolters led the Jackrabbits to their second NCAA Men's Division I Basketball Tournament in 2013. A No. 13 seed, they played No. 4 seed Michigan, losing 71–56.

Professional career

Milwaukee Bucks (2013–2015)
Wolters was selected with the 38th overall pick in 2013 NBA draft by the Washington Wizards. He was later traded to the Philadelphia 76ers on draft night. The next day, he was again traded, this time to the Milwaukee Bucks. In July 2013, he joined the Bucks for the 2013 NBA Summer League and went on to sign his rookie scale contract with the franchise on August 1. As the only healthy point guard the Bucks had on opening night of the 2013–14 season, Wolters ended up playing 30 minutes in his NBA debut, recording nine points, one rebound, four assists, one steal and one block in a 90–83 loss to the New York Knicks. With Luke Ridnour and Brandon Knight out injured, Wolters started seven of Milwaukee's first nine games and averaged 26.2 minutes per game in November. Wolters averaged 8.3 points and 2.7 assists in 17 games after the All-Star break and later started the last 24 games he played in during his rookie season, most of the time alongside Knight as former coach Larry Drew opted to start two point guards. His season ended, however, with 13 games left in the regular season when he suffered a fractured left hand fighting through a screen at Golden State on March 20.

His hand injury did not require surgery and didn't prevent Wolters from missing any time in the offseason as he re-joined the Bucks for the 2014 NBA Summer League. He went on to play sparingly to begin the 2014–15 season under new head coach Jason Kidd and was eventually waived by the Bucks on January 9, 2015, to create roster space to sign veteran big man Kenyon Martin.

New Orleans Pelicans (2015)
On January 14, 2015, Wolters signed a 10-day contract with the New Orleans Pelicans. Two days later, he made his debut for the Pelicans in a 96–81 loss to the Philadelphia 76ers, recording two rebounds and one assist in six minutes off the bench. On January 24, 2015, he signed a second 10-day contract with the Pelicans. Following the conclusion of his second 10-day contract on February 3, the Pelicans decided against signing him for the rest of the season.

Grand Rapids Drive (2015)
On March 6, 2015, Wolters was acquired by the Grand Rapids Drive of the NBA Development League. The next day, he made his D-League debut in a 105–96 loss to the Sioux Falls Skyforce, recording five points, two rebounds and four assists in 21 minutes off the bench. On March 29, 2015, Wolters recorded his first career triple-double after posting 24 points, 11 rebounds and 11 assists in a 108–107 win over the Maine Red Claws.

Beşiktaş (2015–2016)
In July 2015, Wolters joined the Los Angeles Clippers for the 2015 NBA Summer League. However, a fractured middle finger on his left hand ended his summer league stint early after appearing in just three games.

On July 24, 2015, Wolters signed with Turkish team Beşiktaş Sompo Japan for the 2015–16 season. On March 24, 2016, he parted ways with Beşiktaş. In 21 Turkish national league games, he averaged 11.6 points, 4.6 rebounds and 5.4 assists per game.

On September 15, 2016, Wolters signed with the Denver Nuggets, but was waived on October 22 after appearing in four preseason games.

Crvena zvezda (2016–2017)
On October 24, 2016, Wolters signed a one-year deal with Serbian team Crvena zvezda.

Utah Jazz (2017)
On September 13, 2017, Wolters signed a two-way contract with the Utah Jazz. Under the terms of the deal, he split time between the Jazz and their NBA G League affiliate, the Salt Lake City Stars. On December 22, 2017, he was waived by the Jazz after appearing in five games.

Élan Chalon (2018)
On January 17, 2018, Wolters signed with Élan Chalon in France.

Žalgiris Kaunas (2018–2019) 
On July 8, 2018, Wolters joined Žalgiris Kaunas of the Lithuanian Basketball League, signing a one-year deal with an option for another one. Wolters helped Žalgiris reach the 2019 EuroLeague Playoffs, where they eventually were eliminated by Fenerbahçe. He also helped Žalgiris win their 9th consecutive LKL championship.

Maccabi Tel Aviv (2019–2020)
On June 23, 2019, Wolters signed a two-year deal with Maccabi Tel Aviv of the Israeli Premier League and the EuroLeague. He averaged 7.5 points and 2.6 assists per game in Euroleague.

BC UNICS (2020–2021)
On July 25, 2020, Wolters signed with Russian club UNICS Kazan of the VTB United League and the EuroCup. He averaged 8.3 points and 3.0 assists per game.

Return to Crvena zvezda (2021–2022)
On August 10, 2021, Wolters returned to Crvena zvezda for a second stint with the Serbian club. He won the ABA League and Serbian Cup in the 2021–22 season with them. He received the Radivoj Korać Cup MVP Award. In June 2022, Walters went to the U.S. upon the club's approval on personal matters, excluding him for the Serbian League season.

Panathinaikos (2022–present)
On July 15, 2022, Wolters signed a one-year contract with Panathinaikos of the Greek Basket League and the EuroLeague.

Career statistics

NBA

Regular season

|-
| align="left" | 
| align="left" | Milwaukee
| 58 || 31 || 22.6 || .437 || .290 || .656 || 2.6 || 3.2 || .6 || .3 || 7.2
|-
| align="left" | 
| align="left" | Milwaukee
| 11 || 0 || 12.9 || .387 || .000 || .250 || 1.5 || .9 || .5 || .0 || 2.3
|-
| align="left" | 
| align="left" | New Orleans
| 10 || 0 || 10.6 || .286 || .000 || .500 || 1.8 || 1.1 || .3 || .2 || 1.7
|-
| align="left" | 
| align="left" | Utah
| 5 || 0 || 3.8 || .167 || - || - || .4 || .2 || .0 || .0 || .4
|-
| align="center" colspan=2| Career 
| 84 || 31 || 18.8 || .423 || .261 || .635 || 2.2 || 2.5 || .5 || .2 || 5.5

EuroLeague

|-
| style="text-align:left;"| 2016–17
| style="text-align:left;"| Crvena zvezda
| 27 || 1 || 15.1 || .435 || .380 || .781 || 2.1 || 2.2 || .7 || .0 || 7.1 || 6.8
|-
| style="text-align:left;"| 2018–19
| style="text-align:left;"| Žalgiris
| 28 || 19 || 22.9 || .512 || .368 || .694 || 2.8 || 3.8 || .8 || .0 || 11.2 || 11.6
|- class="sortbottom"
| style="text-align:center;" colspan=2| Career
| 55 || 20 || 19.1 || .481 || .373 || .735 || 2.5 || 3.0 || .7 || .0 || 9.2 || 9.3

College

|-
| style="text-align:left;"| 2009–10
| style="text-align:left;"| South Dakota State
| 30 || 12 || 24.3 || .388 || .364 || .831 || 3.4 || 2.8 || 1.1 || .2 || 10.1
|-
| style="text-align:left;"| 2010–11
| style="text-align:left;"| South Dakota State
| 31 || 31 || 33.2 || .447 || .404 || .796 || 4.6 || 6.0 || 1.3 || .2 || 19.4
|-
| style="text-align:left;"| 2011–12
| style="text-align:left;"| South Dakota State
| 34 || 34 || 35.8 || .448 || .241 || .783 || 5.1 || 5.9 || 1.7 || .0 || 21.2
|-
| style="text-align:left;"| 2012–13
| style="text-align:left;"| South Dakota State
| 33 || 33 || 38.1 || .485 || .379 || .813 || 5.5 || 5.8 || 1.7 || .1 || 22.2
|-
|- class="sortbottom"
| style="text-align:center;" colspan="2" | Career
| 128 || 110 || 33.0 || .451 || .342 || .803 || 4.7 || 5.2 || 1.5 || .1 || 18.4

Source: RealGM

See also 

 List of KK Crvena zvezda players with 100 games played

References

External links

 South Dakota State Jackrabbits bio
 EuroLeague profile
 

1991 births
Living people
ABA League players
All-American college men's basketball players
American expatriate basketball people in France
American expatriate basketball people in Greece
American expatriate basketball people in Israel
American expatriate basketball people in Lithuania
American expatriate basketball people in Russia
American expatriate basketball people in Serbia
American expatriate basketball people in Turkey
American men's basketball players
Basketball League of Serbia players
Basketball players from Minnesota
BC UNICS players
BC Žalgiris players
Beşiktaş men's basketball players
Élan Chalon players
Grand Rapids Drive players
KK Crvena zvezda players
Maccabi Tel Aviv B.C. players
Milwaukee Bucks players
New Orleans Pelicans players
Panathinaikos B.C. players
Point guards
Salt Lake City Stars players
South Dakota State Jackrabbits men's basketball players
Sportspeople from St. Cloud, Minnesota
Utah Jazz players
Washington Wizards draft picks